The Baronetcy of Temple, of Stowe, in the Baronetage of England, was created on 24 September 1611 for Thomas Temple, eldest son of John Temple of Stowe, Buckinghamshire. His great-grandson Sir Richard, 4th Baronet, was created Baron Cobham on 19 October 1714, and Viscount Cobham and Baron Cobham on 23 May 1718, the latter with a special remainder, failing his male issue (of which he had none) to his sisters and their heirs male. Upon his death on 13 September 1749, the barony of 1714 became extinct, the viscountcy and barony of 1718 passed to his elder sister, and the baronetcy passed to his second cousin once removed William Temple, of Nash House, who became 5th Baronet. On the death of Sir William's nephew Sir Richard Temple, 7th Baronet, on 15 November 1786, the baronetcy became dormant.

The Earldom of Temple was created in the Peerage of Great Britain on 18 October 1749 for Hester, 2nd Viscountess Cobham, a sister of Richard Temple, 1st Viscount Cobham. She had been married in 1710 to Richard Grenville, of Wotton, Buckinghamshire, and at her death on 6 October 1752, she was succeeded by her eldest son Richard, who became 2nd Earl Temple. His nephew George, 3rd Earl Temple (son of his younger brother George Grenville, who served as Prime Minister), was created Marquess of Buckingham on 4 December 1784. His son Richard, 2nd Marquess of Buckingham and 4th Earl Temple, was created Duke of Buckingham and Chandos and Earl Temple of Stowe in the Peerage of the United Kingdom on 4 February 1822, the latter title with a special remainder to allow female descendants to succeed. On the death of the 3rd Duke of Buckingham and Chandos on 26 March 1889, the Dukedom and Marquessate became extinct, as did the Earldom of 1749. The Earldom of 1822 passed to his nephew William Gore-Langton, son of his sister Lady Anna, and the Viscountcy of Cobham to his fourth cousin once removed, the 5th Lord Lyttelton and Westcote, a great-great-grandson of the younger sister of the 1st Viscount. Both these titles remain extant.


Baronets, of Stowe (1611)
Sir Thomas Temple, 1st Baronet (1567-1637)
Sir Peter Temple, 2nd Baronet (1592-1653)
Sir Richard Temple, 3rd Baronet (1634-1697)
Sir Richard Temple, 4th Baronet (1669-1749), created Viscount Cobham in 1718
Sir William Temple, 5th Baronet (1694-1760)
Sir Peter Temple, 6th Baronet (d. 1761)
Sir Richard Temple, 7th Baronet (1731-1786); at his death, the title became dormant

Earls Temple (1749)
Hester Temple, 1st Countess Temple (1690-1752), also 2nd Viscountess Cobham
Richard Grenville-Temple, 2nd Earl Temple (1711-1779)
George Nugent-Temple-Grenville, 3rd Earl Temple (1753-1813), created Marquess of Buckingham in 1784
Richard Temple-Nugent-Brydges-Chandos-Grenville, 4th Earl Temple, 2nd Marquess of Buckingham (1776-1839), created Duke of Buckingham and Chandos in 1822
Richard Plantagenet Temple-Nugent-Brydges-Chandos-Grenville, 5th Earl Temple, 2nd Duke of Buckingham and Chandos (1797-1861)
Richard Plantagenet Campbell Temple-Nugent-Brydges-Chandos-Grenville, 6th Earl Temple, 3rd Duke of Buckingham and Chandos (1823-1889)

Earls Temple of Stowe (1822)
Richard Temple-Nugent-Brydges-Chandos-Grenville, 1st Earl Temple of Stowe, 1st Duke of Buckingham and Chandos (1776-1839)
Richard Plantagenet Temple-Nugent-Brydges-Chandos-Grenville, 2nd Earl Temple of Stowe, 2nd Duke of Buckingham and Chandos (1797-1861)
Richard Plantagenet Campbell Temple-Nugent-Brydges-Chandos-Grenville, 3rd Earl Temple of Stowe, 3rd Duke of Buckingham and Chandos (1823-1889)
William Temple-Gore-Langton, 4th Earl Temple of Stowe (1847-1902)
for further Earls, see Earl Temple of Stowe

References

Extinct earldoms in the Peerage of Great Britain
Noble titles created in 1749